Lough Skean is a freshwater lake in the northwest of Ireland. It is located mostly in north County Roscommon with a smaller part in County Sligo.

Geography

See also
List of loughs in Ireland

References

Skean
Skean